Pochet is a rural locality (a settlement) in Pochetsky Selsoviet of Abansky District, in Krasnoyarsk Krai, Russia. Population:

Notable people
Viktor Medvedchuk (born 1954), politician

References 

Rural localities in Krasnoyarsk Krai
Abansky District